Valeo is a French global automotive supplier headquartered in France, listed on the Paris Stock Exchange (CAC-40 Index). It supplies a wide range of products to automakers and the aftermarket. The Group employs 113,600 people in 33 countries worldwide. It has 186 production plants, 59 R&D centers and 15 distribution platforms. Its strategy is focused on innovation and development in high-growth potential regions and emerging countries. In 2018, Valeo's sales rose 4% to €19.1 billion. It also ranked as France's leading patent filer from 2016 to 2018.

History
The Société Anonyme Française de Ferodo was founded in 1923 in Saint-Ouen, near Paris. It first distributed brake linings and clutch facings under license of Ferodo Ltd UK.

In 1932, the company began producing clutches. In the same year, it was listed on the Paris Stock Exchange.

In the 1950s, the company expanded outside the Paris area, opening new factories in France.

The firm produced braking systems (1961), thermal systems (1962), lighting systems and electrical systems (1971-1978 and 1984).

The 1960s saw the start of the company's international development, first in Europe, especially in Spain and Italy, and then all over the world: Brazil (1974), the United States (1980), Tunisia (1984), South Korea and Turkey (1988), Mexico (1989), China (1994), India (1997), Central and Eastern Europe (Poland and Czech Republic in 1995, Romania in 2002, Slovakia in 2004 and Egypt in 2005) to total 33 countries at the end 2018.

In May 1980, the company was renamed Valeo, which means "I am well" in Latin.

Acquisitions include German automotive suppliers Peiker and Spheros in 2015, followed by FTE automotive in 2017.

In the early 2000s, Valeo produced parking assistance systems using ultrasonic sensors.

In 2017, Valeo presented its low-voltage prototype electric vehicle at the Consumer Electronics Show in Las Vegas.

In February 2021, Valeo announced that it will invest $5 million to open a new assembly plant in Jefferson County in the city of Bessemer, Alabama expected to create 70 jobs.

Strategy 
Since 2009, CEO Jacques Aschenbroich's strategy has been based on: innovation linked to the reduction of CO2 emissions and intuitive driving, and geographical expansion in high-growth potential countries, notably in Asia and in emerging countries.

From 2009 to 2018, the number of employees increased from 45,000 to 113,600. The Group’s sales rose from €7.5 billion to €19.1 billion. with a strong development in China.

Valeo invests 11,8% of its sales in R&D and innovation. It has 17,900 research and development employees. In 2016 and 2017, the Group ranked as France’s leading patent filer.

Organization
The Group employs 113,601 people in 33 countries throughout the world. It has 184 production plants, 55 R&D centers and 15 distribution platforms.

Four Business Groups 
Valeo is structured around four business units:
 Comfort & Driving Assistance Systems (specialized in technologies to make driving safer, more intuitive, more autonomous and more connected)
 Powertrain Systems (development of innovative solutions for reducing CO2 emissions in terms of electrification, automated transmissions and clean engines for vehicles)
 Thermal Systems (optimization of vehicle thermal management and passenger well-being) 
 Visibility Systems (development of technologies ensuring the best visibility and safety for drivers in all weather conditions)

Its Valeo Service activity supplies original equipment spares to automakers and replacement parts to the independent aftermarket.

International Business 
Original equipment sales growth by destination region:

 Europe and Africa: 46% of sales 
 Asia: 32% of sales
 North America: 20% of sales
 South America: 2% of sales

Financial statistics
Sales (millions)

Breakdown of sales by Business Group 2018
 Driving Assistance Systems: 19% 
 Powertrain Systems: 26%
 Thermal Systems: 26%
 Visibility Systems: 29%

Operating margin (in % of sales)

Asbestos
Valeo, its directors and its corporate medical function have been indicted after a decade-long penal procedure in 2006 for homicide, unintentional injury, and failure to assist a person in danger regarding its former use of asbestos which caused the death of hundreds of employees over many years.

Since, the Valeo Group has set up high health-security standards and has been thoroughly monitoring employees and retired personnel. This policy was ratified in a national agreement with the French government in April 2009. The group secured four former industrial sites with asbestos related issues.

See also
Jacques Aschenbroich

References

External links

Auto parts suppliers of France
Manufacturing companies based in Paris
Manufacturing companies established in 1923
Multinational companies headquartered in France
French brands
French companies established in 1923
Companies listed on Euronext Paris